The Xiuzhen tu is a Daoist diagram of the human body illustrating principles of Neidan , Chinese astrology, and cosmology.

Title
The title Xiuzhen tu combines three Chinese words:
xiu 修 "embellish, decorate; repair, overhaul; study, cultivate; build, construct; trim, prune; write, compile"
zhen 真 "true; real; genuine" or (Daoist) "original, unspoiled character of a person; ultimate reality; a xian transcendent".
tu 圖 "picture; drawing; chart; map; plan"
Common examples of this special Daoist zhen "ultimate truth" meaning include Zhenren 真人 "true person; Spiritual Master" and Quanzhen 全真 "complete truth; Quanzhen School".

Xiuzhen tu is translated into English as:
"Illustration of Developing Trueness" (Alphen and Aris 1995:170)
"Chart of the Cultivation of Perfection" (Kohn 2000:487)
"Diagram of Cultivating Perfection" (Komjathy 2004:53)
"Chart for the Cultivation of Perfection" (Despeux 2008:767)

Xiuzhen is an uncommon word associated with Daoism. It first appears in Ge Hong's (4th century CE) Baopuzi 抱朴子 (行品 chapter), which says xiuzhen practices characterize a daoren 道人 "Daoist". Xiushen 修身 and xiudao 修道 are more common synonyms of xiuzhen that occurred centuries earlier in pre-Han Chinese classic texts.

Xiushen is a basic moral principle of Chinese philosophy. In Confucianism, xiushen is the ethical basis for social order. The Great Learning (tr. Legge 1893:266) says ancient rulers utilized "self cultivation": "Their persons being cultivated, their families were regulated. Their families being regulated, their states were rightly governed. Their states being rightly governed, the whole kingdom was made tranquil and happy." In Daoism, xiushen refers to a supernatural "self cultivation". The Zhuangzi (tr. Mair 1994:96) claims it can result in long life: "Carefully guard your body, and leave other things to prosper themselves. I guard the one so as to dwell in harmony. Thus have I cultivated my person for one thousand two hundred years and my physical form has still not decayed."

Xiudao means "practice a religious regimen; follow religious rules; enter a monastery". The first sentence in the Confucian Doctrine of the Mean (tr. Legge 1893:124) associates xiudao with jiao 教 "teach; instruct": "What Heaven has conferred is called The Nature; an accordance with this nature is called The Path of duty; the regulation of this path is called Instruction."

History
The Xiuzhen tu text probably dates "from the early 19th century" (Komjathy 2004:53) and exists in several versions, some with variant titles like Xiuzhen quantu 修真全圖 "Cultivation of Perfection Complete Diagram". All editions are associated with the Longmen "Dragon Gate" sect of the Quanzhen school of Daoism. Catherine Despeux (2008:770) lists five extant versions: a stele at the Sanyuan Gong 三元宮 "Three Primes Palace" in Guangzhou (dated 1812); printed versions from the Wudang Mountains (1924 reprint of 1888), Shanghai (1920), and Chengdu (1922); and a version at the White Cloud Temple in Beijing (undated).

The Xiuzhen Tu resembles the better-known Neijing Tu 內經圖 "Inner Pathways Diagram". Both these anatomical charts with Daoist Neidan symbolism derive from the earliest diagrams attributed to Yanluozi 煙蘿子 (fl. 10th century) and conserved in the 1250 CE Xiuzhen shishu 修真十書 "Cultivating Perfection Ten Books" (Kohn 2000:521).

Contents
Contrasted with the Neijing tu, the Xiuzhen tu pictures the meditator's body in a front view rather than side, and includes a longer textual portion, which describes Neidan practices, lunar phases, and Leifa 雷法 "Thunder Rites" associated with the Zhengyi Dao movement of the Tianshi Dao "Way of Celestial Masters".

Despeux summarizes Xiuzhen tu differences.
The elements that distinguish this chart from the Neijing tu are mainly related to the Thunder Rites (leifa) – in particular, the spiral at the level of the kidneys, the nine "orifices of hell" at the base of the spine, and the three curls at the top of the head that represent the three primordial breaths according to the Tianxin zhengfa tradition. The chart also represents the main parts of the body, including the Cinnabar Fields (dantian), the Three Passes (sanguan, represented by the three chariots) of the back, the throat, the paradisiacal and infernal worlds, and the body's divinities according to the Huangting jing, and also shows the firing process (huohou). The whole is reminiscent of a talisman illustrating a divine body that connects to the sacred world. (2008:770)

At the same time, the Xiuzhen tu underscores cosmological elements. In particular, the human figure is surrounded by thirty black and white circles that represent the days of the lunar month, one of the models of the Neidan "fire phases". The trigrams arranged around the figure (Zhen ☳, Dui ☱, Qian ☰, Xun ☴, Gen ☶, and Kun ☷) represent the six stages of the lunar cycle, each of which is made of five days.

See also
 Neijing Tu
 Meridian (Chinese medicine)
 Microcosm–macrocosm analogy

References
Alphen, Jan Van and Anthony Aris. 1995. Oriental Medicine: An Illustrated Guide to the Asian Arts of Healing. Art Media Resources.
Despeux, Catherine. 1994. Taoïsme et corps humain: Le Xiuzhen tu. Guy Trédaniel.
Despeux, Catherine. 2008. "Neijing tu and Xiuzhen tu", in The Encyclopedia of Taoism, ed. Fabrizio Pregadio, Routledge, 767-771. .
Legge, James, tr. 1893. The Confucian Analects, the Great Learning, and the Doctrine of the Mean. The Chinese Classics, vol. 1. Oxford University Press.
Kohn, Livia, ed. 2000. Daoism Handbook. Brill. .
Komjathy, Louis. 2004. Daoist Texts in Translation.
Mair, Victor H. 1994. Wandering on the Way: early Taoist tales and parables of Chuang Tzu. Bantam.

External links
修真圖, Another Bilingual (Chinese-English) text of Xiuzhen tu
彩色修真图, color version Xiuzhen tu 
武當丹脈密傳修真圖, Wudangquan version Xiuzhen tu 
修真图, GIF image Xiuzhen tu 
氣功與修真圖, Qigong and Xiuzhen tu, Taoist Culture and Information Centre 
Xiuzhen tu (Chart for the Cultivation of Reality), from the Golden Elixir website

Chinese culture
Chinese words and phrases
Qigong
Taoist art
Taoist texts